The Ankara Synagogue is the largest synagogue in Ankara, the capital of Turkey. It was built in Ulus, the tumbling old quarter of Turkey’s capital, the Ankara Synagogue dates back to the 19th century and was radically refurbished by an Italian architect in 1906. The historical building is kept closed most of the year as it cannot find the required number of congregation members for worship.

See also

 List of synagogues in Turkey

References

63 BC
1840s architecture
Synagogues in Turkey
Religious buildings and structures in Ankara
Landmarks in Turkey
Mausoleums in Turkey